Covington County (briefly Jones County), is a county located in the south central portion of the U.S. state of Alabama. As of the 2020 census the population was 37,570. Its county seat is Andalusia. Its name is in honor of Brigadier General Leonard Covington of Maryland and Mississippi, who died in the War of 1812.

History
Covington County was established on December 17, 1821.  The Alabama state legislature changed the name to Jones County on August 6, 1868.  Two months later on October 10, 1868, the original name was restored.

The county was declared a disaster area in September 1979 due to damage from Hurricane Frederic and again in October 1995 due to Hurricane Opal.

Geography
The county is located in the Gulf Coastal Plain region of the state. It is drained by the Conecuh and Yellow rivers.

Major highways
 U.S. Highway 29
 U.S. Highway 84
 U.S. Highway 331
 State Route 52
 State Route 54
 State Route 55
 State Route 100
 State Route 134
 State Route 137

Adjacent counties
Butler County (north)
Crenshaw County (north)
Coffee County (east) 
Geneva County (east)
Walton County, Florida (southeast)
Okaloosa County, Florida (southwest)
Escambia County (west)
Conecuh County (west)

National protected area
 Conecuh National Forest (part)

Demographics

2000 census
As of the census of 2000, there were 37,631 people, 15,640 households, and 10,791 families living in the county.  The population density was 36 people per square mile (14/km2).  There were 18,578 housing units at an average density of 18 per square mile (7/km2).  The racial makeup of the county was 86.2% White, 12.4% Black or African American, 0.5% Native American, 0.2% Asian, <0.1% Pacific Islander, 0.2% from other races, and 0.6% from two or more races.  0.8% of the population were Hispanic or Latino of any race.

There were 15,640 households, out of which 29.5% had children under the age of 18 living with them, 54.1% were married couples living together, 11.3% had a female householder with no husband present, and 31.0% were non-families. 28.6% of all households were made up of individuals, and 14.1% had someone living alone who was 65 years of age or older.  The average household size was 2.37 and the average family size was 2.90.

In the county, the population was spread out, with 23.5% under the age of 18, 8.1% from 18 to 24, 26.1% from 25 to 44, 24.3% from 45 to 64, and 17.9% who were 65 years of age or older.  The median age was 40 years. For every 100 females there were 91.60 males.  For every 100 females age 18 and over, there were 88.00 males.

The median income for a household in the county was $26,336, and the median income for a family was $33,201. Males had a median income of $27,453 versus $19,640 for females. The per capita income for the county was $15,365.  About 14.1% of families and 18.4% of the population were below the poverty line, including 23.9% of those under age 18 and 19.2% of those age 65 or over.

2010 census
As of the census of 2010, there were 37,765 people, 15,531 households, and 10,791 families living in the county. The population density was 37 people per square mile (14/km2). There were 18,829 housing units at an average density of 18 per square mile (7/km2). The racial makeup of the county was 84.8% White, 12.5% Black or African American, 0.6% Native American, 0.4% Asian, 0.0% Pacific Islander, 0.4% from other races, and 1.4% from two or more races.  1.3% of the population were Hispanic or Latino of any race.

There were 15,531 households, out of which 26.0% had children under the age of 18 living with them, 50.2% were married couples living together, 13.1% had a female householder with no husband present, and 32.1% were non-families. 28.1% of all households were made up of individuals, and 12.6% had someone living alone who was 65 years of age or older. The average household size was 2.39 and the average family size was 2.91.

In the county, the population was spread out, with 22.6% under the age of 18, 7.8% from 18 to 24, 22.8% from 25 to 44, 28.4% from 45 to 64, and 18.4% who were 65 years of age or older.  The median age was 42.4 years. For every 100 females there were 93.9 males.  For every 100 females age 18 and over, there were 96.4 males.

The median income for a household in the county was $33,852, and the median income for a family was $43,468. Males had a median income of $32,463 versus $26,241 for females. The per capita income for the county was $19,822.  About 15.7% of families and 19.0% of the population were below the poverty line, including 28.3% of those under age 18 and 12.8% of those age 65 or over.

 the largest self-reported European ancestry group in Covington County is English with 41.2% of people in Covington County citing that they were of English descent.  They were followed by people who wrote that they were of "American" ancestry, who made up 16.0% of Covington county.  Irish was the third largest self-reported European ancestry with 14.5% of people in the county writing that they were of Irish descent.

2020 census

As of the 2020 United States census, there were 37,570 people, 14,852 households, and 9,924 families residing in the county.

Government
Covington County is reliably Republican at the presidential level. The last Democrat to win the county in a presidential election is Jimmy Carter, who won it by a majority in 1976.

Communities

Cities
Andalusia (county seat)
Opp

Towns

Babbie
Carolina
Florala
Gantt
Heath
Horn Hill
Libertyville
Lockhart
Onycha
Red Level
River Falls
Sanford

Unincorporated communities

Antioch
Beck
Beda
Brooks
Chapel Hill
Estothel
Fairfield
Falco
Green Bay
Huckaville
Loango
McRae
Opine
Rome
Rose Hill
South
Straughn
Wiggins
Wing

See also
National Register of Historic Places listings in Covington County, Alabama
Properties on the Alabama Register of Landmarks and Heritage in Covington County, Alabama
Covington County Website

References

 

 
1821 establishments in Alabama
Populated places established in 1821